John Reeberg (born 19 October 1947) is a retired Dutch-Surinamese karateka. He was a European champion in heavyweight categories in 1978 and 1979 and won a bronze medal at the 1982 World Championships. Earlier in 1977 he became a world champion in the team competition, together with Otti Roethof and Ludwig Kotzebue.

Reeberg is married to Carmelita Reeberg-Muyden, they have a son, John-Roger. Since 1994 they run a security company named Reeberg Beveiliging BV.

References

1947 births
Living people
Dutch male karateka
Surinamese male karateka
Surinamese emigrants to the Netherlands
Sportspeople from Paramaribo